Passiena is a genus of spiders in the family Lycosidae. It was first described in 1890 by Thorell. , it contains 4 species.

References

Lycosidae
Araneomorphae genera
Spiders of Africa
Spiders of Asia